Alexander Peya and Rajeev Ram were the defending champions but Peya could not participate due to injury. Ram played alongside Robert Lindstedt, but lost in the final to Ben McLachlan and Joe Salisbury, 6–7(5–7), 6–7(4–7).

Seeds

Draw

Draw

References
 Main Draw

ATP Shenzhen Open - Doubles
2018 Doubles